Rildo Gonçalves de Amorim Filho (born 21 January 2000), known as Rildo, is a Brazilian professional footballer who plays as an attacking midfielder or winger for Portuguese club Santa Clara.

Club career

Grêmio
Born in Rondonópolis, Rildo joined the Grêmio's Academy at the age of 17 in 2017.

Career statistics

Club

Honours
Grêmio
Campeonato Gaúcho: 2020, 2021, 2022
Recopa Gaúcha: 2021
Individual
 Primeira Liga Goal of the Month: August 2022

References

External links

Profile at the Grêmio F.B.P.A. website

2000 births
People from Rondonópolis
Sportspeople from Mato Grosso
Living people
Brazilian footballers
Association football midfielders
Grêmio Foot-Ball Porto Alegrense players
Grêmio Esportivo Brasil players
Esporte Clube Bahia players
C.D. Santa Clara players
Campeonato Brasileiro Série A players
Campeonato Brasileiro Série B players
Primeira Liga players
Brazilian expatriate footballers
Expatriate footballers in Portugal
Brazilian expatriate sportspeople in Portugal